Manfred Wolf (born 26 March 1957) is a German ice hockey player. He competed in the men's tournaments at the 1984 Winter Olympics and the 1988 Winter Olympics.

References

External links
 

1957 births
Living people
German ice hockey players
Olympic ice hockey players of West Germany
Ice hockey players at the 1984 Winter Olympics
Ice hockey players at the 1988 Winter Olympics
Ice hockey people from Toronto